Moditlo Private Game Reserve (3 500 hectares, approximately 7 500 acres) forms an integral part of the 10 000 hectare Blue Canyon Private Game Reserve, located near Hoedspruit, Limpopo Province, South Africa. The reserve borders Kapama Game Reserve to the eastern side, the Drakensberg Mountains forms the backdrop to the west, and falls into the southern/central region of the Greater Kruger Park biosphere. The size of the Blue Canyon Conservancy has now reached 36,000 acres in total, and is home to typical African game such as lions, elephants, leopards, rhinos, cheetahs, hippos and several hundreds of bird species typical to the lowveld in South Africa. The reserve is also home to a pack of wild dogs, which is the second rarest carnivore species in Africa with only an estimated 2000 remaining specimen in existence.

Wildlife 
African elephant
Rhinoceros
Giraffe
Impala
Wildebeest
Kudu
Lion
African wild dog
Leopard
Cheetah
Spotted hyena
Brown Hyena
Southern ground-hornbill

Accommodation 

 Moditlo River Lodge
 Vuyani Safari Lodge

See also 
Protected areas of South Africa

References 

 Moditlo Private Game Reserve
 Moditlo Safari Private Game Reserve

Protected areas of Limpopo